Nils Hjelmström (29 August 1915 – 17 October 2003) was a Swedish ski jumper. He competed in the individual event at the 1936 Winter Olympics.

References

External links
 

1915 births
2003 deaths
Swedish male ski jumpers
Olympic ski jumpers of Sweden
Ski jumpers at the 1936 Winter Olympics
People from Luleå
Sportspeople from Norrbotten County